The FIS Alpine World Ski Championships 2003 were held in St. Moritz, Switzerland, at Piz Nair from February 2–16, 2003.

St. Moritz previously hosted the world championships in 1974, as well as the 1948 Winter Olympics and the 1928 Winter Olympics (no alpine skiing).

Men's events

Men's downhill

Date: February 8

Men's super-G

Date: February 2

Men's giant slalom

Date: February 12

Men's slalom

Date: February 16

Men's combination

Date: February 6

Women's events

Women's downhill

Date: February 9

Women's super-G

Date: February 3

Women's giant slalom

Date: February 13

Women's slalom

Date: February 15

Women's combination

Date: February 10

Medal table

Course information

References

External links

 FIS-ski.com – results – 2003 World Championships – St. Moritz, Switzerland
 FIS-ski.com -results – World Championships

FIS Alpine World Ski Championships
FIS Alpine World Ski Championships
2003
A
Sport in St. Moritz
Alpine skiing competitions in Switzerland
February 2003 sports events in Europe